This is a list of caves of the world that have articles or that are properly cited. They are sorted by continent and then country. Caves which are in overseas territories on a different continent than the home country are sorted by the territory's continent and name.

Africa

Algeria 

 Aïn Taïba
 Anou Achra Lemoun
 Anou Boussouil
 Anou Ifflis
 Anou Timedouine
 Gueldaman caves
 Ghar Boumâaza (Rivière De La Tafna)
 Grotte de Cervantes 
 Kef Al Kaous

Botswana 

 Gcwihaba
 Rhino Cave

Cameroon 

 Gouffre de Mbilibekon
 Grottes de Linté
 Grotte de Loung
 Grotte de Mfouda
 Grotte Fovu
 Grottes Ndemvoh
 Kouo vu

Democratic Republic of Congo 

 Matupi Cave
 Thysville Caves

Egypt 

 Cave of Beasts
 Cave of Swimmers
 Jabal al-Ṭārif
 Sannur Cave
 Magharet el Kantara

Ethiopia 

 Sof Omar Caves

Gabon 

 Abanda Caves
 Caves of Lastoursville 
 Iroungou cave
 Mbenaltembe cave 
 Faucon cave

Kenya 

 Enkapune Ya Muto
 Grotte de Leviathan
 Kitum Cave
 Leviathan Cave
 Mau Mau Caves
 Njoro River Cave
 Paradise Lost Caves

Lesotho 

 Kome Caves

Libya 

 Ain Zayanah
 Bukarma-Habibi
 Umm al Masabih
 Haua Fteah

Madagascar 

 Ambatoanjahana
 Ambatoharanana
 Ambatomanjahana
 Anjanamba cave
 Ampandrianpanihy Nord
 Andetobe
 Andriafiabe
 Anjohin'ny Voamboana
 Anjohy Ambalarano
 Anjohy Kibojenjy
 Antsatrabonko
 Riviere souterraine de Mananjeba
 Marosakabe cave system

Mauritania 

 Agrour Amogjar

Morocco 

 Caves of Hercules
 Friouato caves
 Ifri N'hamed N'taouia
 Ifri Oudadane
 Jebel Irhoud
 Kef Aziza
 Kef Tikhoubaï
 Kef Toghobeit Cave
 Rhar Chara
 Rhar Chiker
 Taforalt
 Wit Tamdoun

Mozambique 

 Codzo River cave

Nigeria 

 Amanchor Cave
 Ogbunike Caves

Namibia 

 Apollo 11 Cave
 Arnhem Cave
 Dragon's Breath Cave
 The White Lady

Réunion 

 Mussard cave

Rwanda 

 Ubuvumo Bwibihonga
 Ubuvumo Nyabikuri-Ruri
 Ubuvumo Manjari deux
 Ubuvumo bwa Musanze (main segment)
 Ubuvumo bwa Nyirabadogo
 Ubuvumo Cyamazera
 Ubuvumo Gacinyiro 2
 Ubuvumo bwa Musanze (south segment)
 Ubuvumo Nyiragihima
 Ubuvumo Rego

Somaliland 

 Dhambalin
 Laas Geel

South Africa 

 Blombos Cave
 Boesmansgat
 Boomplaas Cave
 Border Cave
 Burchell's Shelter
 Cango Caves
 Cooper's Cave
 Diepkloof Rock Shelter
 Echo Caves
 Gladysvale Cave
 Gondolin Cave
 Haasgat
 Howieson's Poort Shelter
 Die Kelders
 Klasies River Caves
 Kromdraai Fossil Site
 Makapansgat
 Malapa Fossil Site, Cradle of Humankind
 Mapoch's Caves
 Melkhoutboom Cave
 Motsetsi Cave
 Nelson Bay Cave
 Onmeetbarediepgat
 Pinnacle Point
 Plovers Lake
 Rising Star Cave
 Sacred caves of the Basotho
 Sibudu Cave
 Sterkfontein
 Sudwala Caves
 Taung
 Witsie's Cave
 Wonder Cave
 Wonderwerk Cave

Tanzania 

 Amboni Caves
 Grotte de Nduli
 Mumba Cave
 Nandembo cave System

Togo 

Nok and Mamproug Cave Dwellings

Tunisia 

 Rhar Ain Et Tsab

Zambia

 Kalemba Rockshelter
 Mumbwa Caves

Zimbabwe 

 Bambata cave
 Chinhoyi Caves
 Mabura Caves
 Mawenge Mwena Caves of Chimanimani

Asia

Afghanistan 

 Darra-e Kur
 Tora Bora
 Zhawar Kili

Cambodia 

 Roung Dei Ho–Thom Ken
 Laang Spean
 Phnom Chhnork
 Phnom Sampeau
 Phnom Sorsia

China 

 Benxi Water Caves
 Bezeklik Caves
 Binghu Cave
 Er Wang Dong
 Fu Yuan Dong
 Furong Cave
 Fuyan Cave
 Gebihe cave system
 Hongqingsi Grottoes
 Huanglong Cave
 Jiangzhou Cave System
 Jiguan Cave
 Kizil Caves
 Kumtura Caves
 Lobster Cave
 Longgu Cave
 Longyou Caves
 Luobi Cave
 Macaque Cave
 Reed Flute Cave
 San Wang Dong
 Sanmenhai
 Seven-star Cave
 Shanjuan Cave
 Shuanghedong Cave Network
 Shuanglong Cave
 Silver Cave
 Snowy Jade Cave
 Taiji Cave
 Tenglong Cave
 Tianyuan Cave
 Xianren Cave
 Yilong Cave
 Yiyuan Rong Cave Group
 Yuchanyan Cave
 Yuhuangdong Grottoes
 Zhijin Cave
 Zhong Cave
 Zhoukoudian
 Zengpiyan Cave
 Zhiren Cave

East Timor 

 Lene Hara cave

India 

 Ajanta Caves
 Amarnath Cave Temple
 Badami Cave Temples
 Bagh Caves
 Barabar Caves
 Belum Caves
 Borra Caves
 Caves of Meghalaya
 Edakkal Caves
 Elephanta Caves
 Ellora Caves
 Erravaram Caves
 Guntupalli Caves
 Jogeshwari Caves
 Kailash Caves
 Kanheri Caves
 Karla Caves
 Kotumsar Cave
 Krem Liat Prah
 Krem Synrang Pamiang
 Lakhudiyar Caves
 Lenyadri
 Lohani Caves
 Mahakali Caves
 Mandapeshwar Caves
 Moghalrajpuram caves
 Pandavleni Caves
 Patal Bhuvaneshwar
 Robber's Cave
 Rock Shelters of Bhimbetka
 Siju Cave
 Umachal rock cave
 Undavalli caves
 Varaha Cave Temple

Indonesia 

 Buniayu Cave
 Caves in the district of Maros
 Harimau Cave
 Liang Bua Cave
 Lokale
 Lubang Jeriji Saléh
 Maharani cave
 Mirror Stone Cave
 Pettakere cave
 Pindul Cave

Iran 

 Ali-Sadr Cave
 Bisitun Cave
 Darband Cave
 Dashkasan
 Deragon Cave
 Do-Ashkaft Cave
 Eshkaft-e Salman
 Eshkaft-e Siahoo
 Ghar Parau
 Ghar-e-Pariyan
 Ghar-e-Roodafshan
 Huto and Kamarband Caves
 Kalahrod
 Karaftu
 Katale Khor
 Mahi Kur Cave
 Nakhcheer
 Qaleh Bozi
 Quri Qale Cave
 Roodafshan Cave
 Shafaq cave
 Shapur cave
 Shirabad cave
 Wezmeh
 Yafteh

Iraq 

 Shanidar Cave

Israel 

 Avshalom Cave
 Ayalon Cave
 Azekah Caves
 Beit She'arim (moshav)
 Cave of Elijah
 Cave of Horror
 Cave of Letters
 Cave of Nicanor
 Es Skhul
 HaYonim Cave
 Horvat Midras
 Kebara Cave
 Keshet Cave
 Komotayim cave
 Kutim Cave
 Malcham cave
 Mankhir Cave
 Manot Cave
 Nahal Me'arot
 Pa'ar Cave
 Qesem Cave
 Rosh HaNikra grottoes
 Salt Colonel Cave
 Tabun Cave
 Tel Maresha

Japan 

 Abukuma-do (阿武隈洞)
 Akiyoshi-do (秋芳洞)
 Akkadō (安家洞)
 Kyusen-do (球泉洞)
 Reigandō
 Uchimagi-do (内間木洞)
 Shiraho Saonetabaru Cave Ruins

Jordan

 Iraq ed-Dubb
 Al-Fahda cave

Kazakhstan 

 Akbaur cave
 Boj-Boulok
 Rangkul'skaja Cave

Korea 

 Geomunoreum Lava Tube System
 Gimnyeonggul
 Gosu Cave
 Gwangmyeong Cave
 Hwanseon Cave
 Jeju Volcanic Island and Lava Tubes
 Komun Moru
 Manjanggul
 Songam Cavern
 Billemotdonggul

Laos 

 Chom Ong
 Pak Ou Caves
 Tam Pa Ling Cave
 Tham Jang
 Tham Kong Lo
 Tham Non
 Tham Pha
 Tham Phu Kham
 Tham Sang Triangle
 Viengxay caves

Lebanon 

 Antelias cave
 Jeita Grotto
 Nachcharini
 Kaukaba
 Ksar Akil
 Ras Baalbek I
 Ras El Kelb

Malaysia 

 Batu Caves
 Biocyclone Cave
 Clearwater Cave
 Deer Cave
 Gomantong Cave
 Gua Tempurung
 Niah Caves
 Sam Poh Tong
 Sarawak Chamber

Mongolia 

 Dayan Deerh Cave
 Galtai Cave
 Khoit Tsenkher Cave
 Taliin Cave
Tsagaan Cave

Myanmar 

 Padah-Lin Caves
 Peik Chin Myaung Cave
 Phowintaung
 Pindaya Caves

Nepal 

 Chobhar caves
 Gupteshwor Mahadev Cave
 Mahendra Cave
 Maratika Cave
 Mustang Caves
 Siddha cave

Oman 

 Al Hoota Cave
 Majlis al Jinn

Pakistan 

 Bazar Caves
 Pir Ghaib Gharr Gharra
 Kashmir Smast
 Sanghao Cave

Papua New Guinea 

 Afawa Cave
 Atea Cave
 Diu Diu Cave
 Kilu Cave
 Tawali Skull Cave

Philippines 

 Adiangao Cave
 Callao Cave
 Caves in Misamis Oriental
 Guyangan Cave System
 Hinagdanan Cave
 Huluga Caves
 Kalanay Cave
 Kutawato Caves
 Lapuz Lapuz Cave
 Libmanan Caves National Park
 Lucsuhin Natural Bridge
 Macahambus Cave
 Minori Cave
 Monfort Bat Sanctuary
 Pamitinan Cave
 Puerto Princesa Subterranean River National Park
 Sohoton Cave
 Tabon Cave

Qatar 

 Al Mukaynis
 Dhal Al Misfir

Russia 

 Akhshtyrskaya Cave
 Avilova Cave
 Chertovy Vorota Cave
 Denisova Cave
 Ignatievka Cave
 Kapova Cave
 Kungur Ice Cave
 Kurgazak cave
 Marble Cave
 Mezmaiskaya cave
 Okladnikov Cave
 Orda Cave
 Salavat Yulayev Cave
 Sugomak Cave
 Syukeyevo Caves
 Vorontsovka Caves
 Vyalova cave

Saudi Arabia 

 Umm Jirsan System

Sri Lanka 

 Andirilena Cave
 Batatotalena Cave
 Belilena Cave
 Bogoda Cave
 Dambulla Cave Temple
 Fa Hien Cave
 Hunugalagala Limestone Cave
 Kuragala
 Lahugala Cave
 Nitro Cave
 Pannila Cave
 Rawana Ella Cave
 Sithripura Cave
 Wavulpone Cave

South Korea 

 Geumganggul Cave

Thailand 

 Doi Nang Non
 Emerald Cave
 Naresuan Cave
 Spirit Cave
 Tham Hua Kalok
 Tham Lot
 Tham Mae Lana
 Tham Phra Wang Daeng

Turkmenistan 

 Cave of Dzhebel
 Koytendag Caves

Uzbekistan

 Boybuloq Cave
 Dark Star
 Obi-Rakhmat Grotto
 Teshik-Tash

Vietnam

West Bank 

 Cave of the Patriarchs
 Cave of the Ramban
 Qumran
 Warren's Shaft
 Zedekiah's Cave

Europe

Armenia 

 Areni-1 Cave
 Azokh Cave

Austria 

 Drachenhöhle
 Eisriesenwelt
 Gudenus cave
 Lamprechtsofen
 Lurgrotte
 Salzofen cave
 Schwarzmooskogel Cave System
 Seegrotte
 Spannagel Cave
 Steinbrücken Cave
 Tischofer Cave
 Traungold Cave
 Unicorn Cave

Azerbaijan 

 Allar Cave
 Ashabi-Kahf in Nakhchivan
 Azokh Cave
 Buzeyir cave
 Damjili Cave
 Tağlar Cave
 Zar Cave

Belgium 

 Caves of Han-sur-Lesse
 Caves of Hotton
 Goyet Caves
 Grotte de Rosée
 Neptune Caves
 Naulette
 Scladina
 Spy Cave
 Trou de l’Abîme

Bosnia and Herzegovina 

 Badanj Cave
 Vjetrenica

Bulgaria 

 Bacho Kiro Cave
 Devetashka cave
 Kozarnika
 Ledenika
 Magura Cave
 Orlova Chuka
 Devil's Throat Cave
 Prohodna
 Saeva dupka
 Snezhanka Cave
 Uhlovitsa
 Yagodinska cave

Croatia 

 Amfora Pit
 Baredine Cave
 Biserujka
 Blue Grotto
 Caves of Barać
 Drakonjina špilja
 Grabovača
 Grapčeva cave
 Jazovka
 Red Lake
 Vela Spila
 Velebit caves
 Vindija Cave
 Vrtare Male

Czech Republic 

 Amatérská Cave
 Býčí skála
 Hranice Abyss
 Klácelka
 Koněprusy Caves
 Kůlna Cave
 Macocha Gorge in the Punkva Caves
 Mladeč caves
 Moravian Karst
 Punkva Caves
 Šipka
 Zbrašov aragonite caves

Denmark 

 Sorte Gryde
 Sorte Ovn
 Våde Ovn

Finland 

 Halonen Cave
 Wolf Cave

France 

 Aven Armand
 Aven d'Orgnac
 Barry Troglodyte Village
 Caverne du Pont-d'Arc
 Caves of Arcy-sur-Cure
 Caves of Gargas
 Chauvet Cave
 Bournillon cave
 Réseau de la Dent de Crolles
 Font-de-Gaume
 Gouffre Berger
 Grotte des Demoiselles
 Grottes du Cerdon
 Grottes Pétrifiantes de Savonnières
 Grottes de Presque
 Jean Bernard System
 La Mansonnière cave
 La Verna cave
 Lascaux Cave
 Les Combarelles
 Niaux Cave
 Padirac Cave
 Pech Merle
 Rouffignac Cave
 Vercors Cave System
 Villars Cave

Georgia 

 Abrskil Cave
 Cave of Bethlehem
 Krubera Cave
 New Athos Cave
 Sarma cave
 Satsurblia Cave
 Tsona Cave

Germany 

 Aachtopf
 Atta Cave
 Balve Cave
 Barbarossa Cave
 Baumann's Cave
 Bing Cave
 Blauhöhle
 Blautopf
 Brillenhöhle
 Caves and Ice Age Art in the Swabian Jura
 Daneil's Cave
 Das verfluchte Jungfernloch
 Dechen Cave
 Devil's Cave
 Easter Cave
 Eberstadt Stalactite Cave
 Erdmanns Cave
 Geissenklösterle
 Heimkehle
 Hermann's Cave
 Hohler Fels
 Hohlenstein-Stadel
 Iberg Dripstone Cave
 Kleine Feldhofer Grotte
 Lichtenstein Cave
 Ofnet Caves
 Riesending cave
 Saalfeld Fairy Grottoes
 Schellenberg Ice Cave
 Sirgenstein Cave
 Unicorn Cave
 Vogelherd Cave
 Volkmarskeller
 Weingartenloch
 Wimsener Höhle

Gibraltar 

 Gorham's Cave
 Ibex Cave
 Martin's Cave
 St. Michael's Cave
 Vanguard Cave

Greece 

 Alepotrypa cave
 Apidima Cave
 Arkaliospilio
 Arkoudiotissa Cave
 Blue Cave
 Cave of Euripides
 Cave of the Lakes
 Corycian Cave
 Davelis Cave
 Dersios sinkhole
 Doxa
 Eileithyia Cave
 Franchthi Cave
 Gourgouthakas
 Kleidi Cave
 Megalakkos
 Ossa cave
 Petralona Cave
 Phyle Cave
 Propantes
 Sacred caves of Crete
 Stravomyti
 Sykia (Voula)
 Theopetra cave
 Vari Cave

Hungary 

 Aggtelek Karst
 Anna Cave
 Baradla-Domica Cave System
 Cave Bath
 Caves of Aggtelek Karst and Slovak Karst
 Gellért Hill Cave
 István Cave
 Molnár János Cave
 Rákóczi Cave
 Szelim cave

Iceland 

 Búri
 The Caves of Ægissíða
 Grjótagjá
 Hellnahellir
 Kverkfjöll
 Landmannahellir
 Surtshellir
 Víðgelmir

Ireland 

 Aillwee Cave
 Caves of Kesh
 Cloyne Cave
 Crag Cave
 Doolin Cave
 Dunmore Caves
 Fintan's Grave
 Kelly's Cave
 Killavullen Caves
 Marble Arch Caves
 Mitchelstown Caves
 Noon's Hole
 Pollatoomary
 Pollnagollum
 Shannon Cave
 St Patrick's Purgatory

Italy 

 Abisso Bonetti
 Arene Candide
 Blue Grotto
 Borgio Verezzi Caves
 Castelcivita Caves
 Castellana Caves
 Cave of Dogs
 Coreca Caves
 Deer Cave
 Duino Mithraeum
 Ear of Dionysius
 Frasassi Caves
 Grotta Bianca
 Grotta del Castiglione
 Grotta del Cavallo
 Grotta del Cavallone
 Grotta del Pisco
 Grotta dell'Addaura
 Grotta dell'Arco
 Grotta dell'Arsenale
 Grotta dell'Artiglieria
 Grotta delle Felci
 Grotta Delle Prazziche
 Grotta dello Smeraldo
 Grotta di Ispinigoli
 Grotta di Matromania
 Grotte di Pilato
 Grotta Gigante
 Grotta Grande Del Ciolo
 Grotta Piccola Del Ciolo
 Grotta Regina del Carso
 Grotta Verde
 Monte Kronio
 Neptune's Grotto
 Nereo Cave
 Paglicci Cave
 Pastena Caves
 Pertosa Caves
 Romito Cave
 Toirano Caves

Kosovo 

 Marble Cave
 Gryka e Madhe Cave 
 Shpella e Kallabes
 Shpella e Karamakazit
 Shpella e Radavcit

Latvia 

 Gutmanis Cave
 Liv Sacrifice Caves

Malta 

 Blue Grotto
 Ghar Dalam
 Għar ix-Xiħ
 Ghar Lapsi
 Ninu's Cave
 Ras id-Dawwara
 Xerri's Grotto

North Macedonia 

 Alilica

 Pešna

Norway 

 Greftkjelen
 Greftsprekka
 Grønligrotta
 Jarlshola
 Jordbrugrotta
 Larshullet
 Oskola-Kristihola
 Radiohola
 Raggejavreraige
 Setergrotta
 Svarthola
 Tjoarvekrajgge
 Trollkirka

Poland 

 Bańdzioch Kominiarski
 Jaskinia Czarna
 Jaskinia Kozia
 Jaskinia Miętusia
 Jaskinia Mylna
 Jaskinia Niedźwiedzia
 Jaskinia Raj
 Jaskinia Wielka Śnieżna
 Paradise Cave
 Ptasia Studnia
 Radochów Cave
 Smocza Jama
 Śnieżna Studnia

Portugal 

 Almonda Cave
 Cave of Aroeira
 Cave of Pedra Furada
 Cave of Pego do Diabo
 Cave of Salemas
 Escoural Cave
 Furnas do Cavalum
 Mira de Aire Caves
 Moinhos Velhos Cave
 São Vicente Caves
 Torres Cave

Romania 

 Bears' Cave
 Coliboaia Cave
 Cuciulat Cave
 Movile Cave
 Peștera cu Oase
 Peștera Muierilor
 Peștera Vântului
 Scărișoara Cave
 Tăușoare-Zalion Reserve
 Topolnița Cave

Serbia 

 Brežđe
 Cave Church
 Cerje Cave
 Degurić Cave
 Hadži-Prodan's Cave
 Kađenica
 Lazareva Pećina
 Pešturina
 Petnica Cave
 Potpeć Cave
 Rajkova cave
 Resava Cave
 Risovača Cave
 Stopića cave

Slovakia 

 Belianska Cave
 Bystrianska Cave
 Demänovská Cave of Liberty
 Demänovská Ice Cave
 Dobšiná Ice Cave
 Domica Cave
 Driny
 Gombasek Cave
 Harmanecká Cave
 Jasovská Cave
 Krásnohorská Cave
 Ochtinská Aragonite Cave
 Važecká Cave

Slovenia 

 Cross Cave
 Divje Babe
 Hell Cave
 Krka Cave
 Planina Cave
 Postojna Cave
 Potok Cave
 Škocjan Caves
 System Migovec
 Vilenica Cave
 Vrtoglavica
 Weaver Cave

Spain 

 Altamira
 Armintxe Cave
 Canelobre Caves
 Cave of Altamira and Paleolithic Cave Art of Northern Spain
 Cave of Chufín
 Cave of El Castillo
 Cave of El Soplao
 Cave of La Pasiega
 Cave of Niño
 Cave of the Barranc del Migdia
 Cave of Valporquero
 Caves in Cantabria
 Caves of King Cintolo
 Caves of Nerja
 Caves of Valeron
 Coves dels Hams
 Cueva de la Fuente
 Cueva de la Pileta
 Cueva de los Casares
 Cueva de los Murciélagos
 Cueva de los Verdes
 Cueva de Montesinos
 Cueva del Viento
 Cuevas de El Castillo
 Cuevas de la Araña
 Cuevas de Sorbas
 Cuevas del Drach
 Four Doors cave site
 Fuentemolinos cave
 Grotte Casteret
 Gruta de las Maravillas
 Las Caldas cave
 Ojo Guareña
 Ordesa Cascada
 Painted Cave
 Praileaitz Cave
 Santa Cueva de Covadonga
 Santuario de la Cueva Santa
 Sidrón Cave
 Tito Bustillo Cave

Sweden 

 Coral Cave
 Hoverbergsgrottan
 Lummelunda Cave

Switzerland 

 Grotte aux Fées
 Hölloch
 Saint-Léonard underground lake
 Siebenhengste-Hohgant-Höhle
 St. Beatus Caves
 Wildkirchli

Turkey 

 Akhayat sinkhole
 Ayvaini Cave
 Ballıca Cave
 Belbaşı
 Beldibi Cave
 Buzluk
 Cave dwellings of Ahlat
 Çayırköy Cave
 Cehennem Cave
 Cehennemağzı Cave
 Cennet Cave
 Cumayanı Cave
 Damlataş Cave
 Derebucak Çamlık Caves
 Dupnisa Cave
 Erçek Cave
 Egma Sinkhole
 Gilindire Cave
 Gökgöl Cave
 Ilıksu Cave
 İnağzı Cave
 Inkaya Cave
 İnsuyu Cave
 Karaca Cave
 Karain Cave
 Kızılelma Cave
 Kocain Cave
 Nimara Cave
 Oylat Cave
 Pınargözü Cave
 Sofular Cave
 Tilkiler Cave
 Yarımburgaz Cave
 Yenesu Cave
 Zeytintaşı Cave

Ukraine 

 Atlantida
 Near Caves
 Odessa Catacombs
 Optymistychna
 Priest's Grotto
 Vyalova cave

United Kingdom 

 Alum Pot
 Aquamole Pot
 Aveline's Hole
 Badger Pot
 Bakers pit
 Bar Pot
 Blue John Cavern
 Boho Caves
 Boxhead Pot
 Cathole Cave
 Charterhouse Cave
 Chislehurst Caves
 Clearwell Caves
 Cleeves Cove cave
 Cox's cave
 Crackpot Cave
 Creswell Crags
 Crystal Cave
 Dan yr Ogof
 Death's Head Hole
 Disappointment Pot
 Dog Hole Cave
 Ease Gill Caverns
 Eastwater Cavern
 Eden Sike Cave
 Excalibur Pot
 Father Foote's Cave
 Fingal's Cave
 Flood Entrance Pot
 Gaping Gill
 Gavel Pot
 GB Cave
 Giant's Hole
 Goatchurch Cavern
 Gough's Cave
 Great Douk Cave
 Great Masson Cavern
 Great Rutland Cavern
 Heathery Burn Cave
 Ingleborough Cave
 Jib Tunnel
 Juniper Gulf
 Kent's Cavern
 Kirkdale Cave
 La Cotte de St Brelade
 Lamb Leer
 Langcliffe Pot
 Long Churn Cave
 Long Drop Cave
 Longwood Swallet
 Lost John's Cave
 Lost Pot
 Manor Farm Swallet
 Marble Arch Caves
 Mossdale Caverns
 Mother Ludlam's Cave
 Mother Shipton's Cave
 Nidderdale Caves
 Noon's Hole
 Ogof Agen Allwedd
 Ogof Craig a Ffynnon
 Ogof Draenen
 Ogof Ffynnon Ddu
 Ogof Hen Ffynhonnau
 Ogof Hesp Alyn
 Ogof Llyn Parc
 Ogof y Daren Cilau
 Otter Hole
 Oxlow Cavern
 Pate Hole
 Peak Cavern
 Pen Park Hole
 Pierre's Pot
 Poole's Cavern
 Portbraddon Cave
 Porth Yr Ogof
 Pridhamsleigh Cavern
 Rat Hole
 Reed's Cave
 Reservoir Hole
 Rhino Rift
 Rowten Pot
 Rumbling Hole
 Ryedale Windypits
 Shannon Cave
 Shatter Cave
 Short Drop Cave
 Sidcot Swallet
 Simpson Pot
 Skirwith Cave
 Slaughter Stream Cave
 Smoo Cave
 Speedwell Cavern
 St Cuthbert's Swallet
 Stoke Lane Slocker
 Stream Passage Pot
 Stump Cross Caverns
 Swildon's Hole
 Swinsto Cave
 Thor's Cave
 Three Counties System
 Thrupe Lane Swallet
 Titan
 Treak Cliff Cavern
 Uamh an Claonaite
 Upper Flood Swallet
 Weathercote Cave
 White Scar Caves
 Wookey Hole Caves
 Yordas Cave

North America

Belize 

 Actun Box Ch'iich'
 Actun Tunichil Muknal
 Barton Creek Cave
 Che Chem Ha Cave
 Chiquibul Cave System
 Great Blue Hole
 Midnight Terror Cave
 Nohoch Che'en

Bermuda 

 Crystal Cave

Canada 

 Arctomys Cave
 Artlish Caves Provincial Park
 Bluefish Caves
 Booming Ice Chasm
 Cadomin Cave
 Canyon Creek Ice Cave
 Castleguard Cave
 Cave and Basin National Historic Site
 Cavernicole Cave
 Charlie Lake Cave
 Close to the Edge
 Cody Caves
 Gargantua
 The "Hole in the Wall"
 Horne Lake Caves Provincial Park
 Nakimu Caves
 Raspberry Rising Cave
 Trou du Diable
 Warsaw Caves

El Salvador 

 Holy Spirit Grotto

Guatemala 

 Actún Can
 Candelaria Caves
 Chiquibul Cave System
 Cuevas del Silvino
 Grutas de Lanquín
 Naj Tunich

Honduras 

 Cuevas de Taulabé
 Cuyamel Caves
 Talgua caves

Mexico 

 Balankanche
 Cacahuamilpa Cave
 Cave of the Crystals
 Cave of Swallows
 Chan Hol
 Chevé Cave
 Chiquihuitillos
 Choo-Ha
 Coxcatlan Cave
 Cueva de Villa Luz
 Devil's Throat at Punta Sur
 Frightful Cave
 Guilá Naquitz Cave
 Grutas de Cacahuamilpa National Park
 Grutas de García
 Jolja'
 Juxtlahuaca
 Loltun Cave
 Ndaxagua
 Sistema Dos Ojos
 Sistema Nohoch Nah Chich
 Sistema Ox Bel Ha
 Sistema Sac Actun
 Tolantongo
 Zacatón

Panama 

 Bayano Caves

United States 

 Aeolus Cave, Vermont
 Airmen's Cave, Texas
 Alabaster Caverns State Park, Oklahoma
 Antelope Cave, Arizona
 Ape Cave, Washington
 Arnold Lava Tube System, Oregon
 Ash Hollow Cave, Nebraska
 Baker Cave, Texas
 Bandera Volcano Ice Cave, New Mexico
 Bat Cave, Kentucky
 Bat Cave mine, Arizona
 Batcheller's Cave, New Hampshire
 Beaver Valley Rock Shelter Site, Delaware
 Bechan Cave, Utah
 Bell Witch Cave, Tennessee
 Big Bone Cave, Tennessee
 Big Four Ice Caves, Washington
 Black Chasm Cave, California
 Blanchard Springs Caverns, Arkansas
 Blowhole Cave, Utah
 Blue Spring Cave, Tennessee
 Bluespring Caverns, Indiana
 Bluff Dweller's Cave, Missouri
 Bobcat Trail Habitation Cave, Hawaii
 Boone's Cave Park, North Carolina
 Boyd Cave, Oregon
 Boyden Cave, California
 Bracken Cave, Texas
 Bridal Cave, Missouri
 Buckner Cave, Indiana
 Bull Shoals Caverns, Arkansas
 Bull Thistle Cave Archaeological Site, Virginia
 Burnet Cave, New Mexico
 Burro Flats Painted Cave, California
 California Caverns, California
 Carlsbad Caverns, New Mexico
 Cascade Cave, Kentucky
 Cascade Caverns, Texas
 Cass Cave, West Virginia
 Cathedral Caverns State Park, Alabama
 Cave-in-Rock, Illinois
 Cave of the Bells, Arizona
 Cave of the Mounds, Wisconsin
 Cave of the Winds, Colorado
 Cave of the Winds, New York
 Cave Without a Name, Texas
 Caverns of Sonora, Texas
 Caves of St. Louis, Missouri
 Charles Town Cave, West Virginia
 Cheese Cave, Washington
 Cherney Maribel Caves County Park, Wisconsin
 Clarks Cave, Virginia
 Clarksville Cave, New York
 Cliff Cave, Missouri
 Cold Water Cave, Iowa
 Colossal Cave, Arizona
 Colossal Cave, Kentucky
 Conkling Cavern, New Mexico
 Coronado Cave, Arizona
 Cosmic Cavern, Arkansas
 Coudersport Ice Mine, Pennsylvania
 Craighead Caverns, Tennessee
 Crystal Cave, Sequoia National Park, California
 Crystal Cave, Kentucky
 Crystal Cave, Ohio
 Crystal Cave, Pennsylvania
 Crystal Cave, Wisconsin
 Crystal Cavern, Alabama
 Crystal Grottoes, Maryland
 Cumberland Bone Cave, Maryland
 Cumberland Caverns, Tennessee
 Current River Cavern, Missouri
 Danger Cave, Utah
 Decorah Ice Cave State Preserve, Iowa
 Derrick Cave, Oregon
 DeSoto Caverns, Alabama
 Devil's Den Cave, Florida
 Devil's Kitchen, Michigan
 Devils Hole, Nevada
 Diamond Caverns, Kentucky
 Dixie Caverns, Virginia
 Dunbar Cave State Park, Tennessee
 Dust Cave, Alabama
 Eagle Cave, Wisconsin
 Ellenville Fault Ice Caves, New York
 Eleven Jones Cave, Kentucky
 Ellison's Cave, Georgia
 Endless Caverns, Virginia
 False Kiva, Utah
 Fantastic Caverns, Missouri
 Fern Cave National Wildlife Refuge, Alabama
 Fern Grotto, Hawaii
 Fisher Ridge Cave System, Kentucky
 Florida Caverns, Florida
 Fort Rock Cave, Oregon
 Fox Cave, New Mexico
 Franktown Cave, Colorado
 Gap Cave, Virginia
 Gardner Cave, Washington
 Gillespie Cave, Tennessee
 Glenwood Caverns, Colorado
 Glover's Cave, Kentucky
 Goochland Cave, Kentucky
 Grand Caverns, Virginia
 Grand Canyon Caverns, Arizona
 Great Onyx Cave, Kentucky
 Gypsum Cave, Nevada
 Hall City Cave, California
 Haynes Cave, West Virginia
 Hellhole, West Virginia
 Hendrie River Water Cave, Michigan
 Hidden Cave, Nevada
 Hobo Cave, Colorado
 Hogup Cave, Utah
 Horse Cave, Kentucky
 Horse Caves, Massachusetts
 Horse Lava Tube System, Oregon
 Howe Caverns, New York
 Hubbard's Cave, Tennessee
 Humboldt Cave, Nevada
 Ice Cave, Iowa
 Illinois Caverns, Illinois
 Indian Cave State Park, Nebraska
 Indian Caverns, Pennsylvania
 Indian Echo Caverns, Pennsylvania
 Indian Jim's Cave, Virginia
 Indiana Caverns, Indiana
 Infernal Caverns, California
 Inner Space Caverns, Texas
 Jacobs Cavern, Missouri
 Jacob's Well, Texas
 Jewel Cave, South Dakota
 Kartchner Caverns, Arizona
 Kazumura Cave, Hawaii
 Key Cave National Wildlife Refuge, Alabama
 Kickapoo Cavern State Park, Texas
 King Phillip's Cave, Massachusetts
 Kingston Saltpeter Cave, Georgia
 Kuna Caves, Idaho
 Lake Shasta Caverns, California
 Laurel Caverns, Pennsylvania
 Lava Beds National Monument, California
 Lava River Cave, Arizona
 Lava River Cave, Oregon
 Lechuguilla Cave, New Mexico
 Lehman Caves, Nevada
 Leon Sinks Geological Area, Florida
 Lewis and Clark Caverns, Montana
 Linville Caverns, North Carolina
 Lockport Cave, New York
 Logan Cave National Wildlife Refuge, Arkansas
 Lookout Mountain Caverns, Tennessee
 Lost Cove Cave, Tennessee
 Lost River Cave, Kentucky
 Lost River Caverns, Pennsylvania
 Lost River Gorge Cave, New Hampshire
 Lost World Caverns, West Virginia
 Lovelock Cave, Nevada
 Luray Caverns, Virginia
 Makauwahi Cave, Hawaii
 Mammoth Cave National Park, Kentucky
 Mammoth Cave, Utah
 Manitou Cave, Alabama
 Mantle's Cave, Colorado
 Maquoketa Caves State Park, Iowa
 Marengo Cave, Indiana
 Mark Twain Cave, Missouri
 Marmes Rockshelter, Washington
 Martin Ridge Cave System, Kentucky
 Marvel Cave, Missouri
 Mary Campbell Cave, Ohio
 Mega Cavern, Kentucky
 Meramec Caverns, Missouri
 Mercer Caverns, California
 Minnetonka Cave, Idaho
 Mitchell Caverns, California
 Moaning Cavern, California
 Moqui Cave, Utah
 Mud Caves, California
 Mummy Cave, Wyoming
 Mystery Cave, Minnesota
 Mystic Caverns and Crystal Dome, Arkansas
 Natural Bridge Caverns, Texas
 Natural Tunnel State Park, Virginia
 Neffs Cave, Utah
 Nickajack Cave, Tennessee
 Niter Ice Cave, Idaho
 Nutty Putty Cave, Utah
 Ogdens Cave Natural Area Preserve, Virginia
 Ohio Caverns, Ohio
 Old Spanish Treasure Cave, Arkansas
 Olentangy Indian Caverns, Ohio
 Oligo-Nunk Cave System, Kentucky
 Onondaga Cave State Park, Missouri
 Onyx Cave, Arizona
 Onyx Cave, Arkansas
 Onyx Cave, Missouri
 Oregon Caves National Monument, Oregon
 Organ Cave, West Virginia
 Ozark Caverns, Missouri
 Paisley Caves, Oregon
 Paradise Ice Cave, Washington
 Peacock Springs Cave System, Florida
 Pellerito Cave, Michigan
 Pendejo Cave, New Mexico
 Penns Cave, Pennsylvania
 Peppersauce Cave, Arizona
 Petty John's Cave, Georgia
 Pictograph Cave, Arkansas
 Pictograph Cave, Montana
 Pluto's Cave, California
 Polar Caves Park, New Hampshire
 Port Kennedy Bone Cave, Pennsylvania
 Raccoon Mountain Caverns, Tennessee
 Redmond Caves, Oregon
 Research Cave, Missouri
 Ricks Spring, Utah
 Rickwood Caverns State Park, Alabama
 Riverbluff Cave, Missouri
 Robbers Cave State Park, Oklahoma
 Rock Dove Cave, Texas
 Ruby Falls Cave, Tennessee
 Rushmore Cave, South Dakota
 Russell Cave, Alabama
 Samuels' Cave, Wisconsin
 Sandia Cave, New Mexico
 Sandy Glacier Caves, Oregon
 Sauta Cave National Wildlife Refuge, Alabama
 Sea Lion Caves, Oregon
 Seneca Caverns, Ohio
 Seneca Caverns, West Virginia
 Shawnee Cave, Indiana
 Shelta Cave, Alabama
 Shelter Cave, New Mexico
 Shenandoah Caverns, Virginia
 Sinks of Gandy, West Virginia
 Sitting Bull Crystal Caverns, South Dakota
 Skeleton Cave, Arizona
 Skeleton Cave, Oregon
 Skull Cave, Michigan
 Skylight Cave, Oregon
 Skyline Caverns, Virginia
 Smoke Hole Caverns, West Virginia
 Snail Shell Cave, Tennessee
 Snowy River Cave, New Mexico
 Spook Cave, Iowa
 Squire Boone Caverns, Indiana
 Spring Cave, Colorado
 Spring Creek Cave, Texas
 Spring Mill State Park, Indiana
 Spring Valley Caverns, Minnesota
 St. John Mine, Wisconsin
 Stay High Cave, Virginia
 Talking Rocks Cavern, Missouri
 Tears of the Turtle Cave, Montana
 Thumping Dick Hollow, Tennessee
 Timpanogos Cave National Monument, Utah
 Toquima Cave, Nevada
 Tory Cave, New York
 Tory's Cave, Connecticut
 Tory's Cave, Vermont
 Tuckaleechee Caverns, Tennessee
 Twin caves, Indiana
 Tyson Spring Cave, Minnesota
 Tytoona Cave, Pennsylvania
 Unthanks Cave Natural Area Preserve, Virginia
 Ursa Minor, California
 Ventana Cave, Arizona
 Wabasha Street Caves, Minnesota
 Wakulla Cave, Florida
 Warren's Cave, Florida
 Weeki Wachee Springs, Florida
 Wilson Butte Cave, Idaho
 Wind Cave National Park, South Dakota
 Wonder Cave, Texas
 Wonderland Cave, Arkansas
 Wyandotte Caves, Indiana
 Zane Shawnee Caverns, Ohio

Caribbean

Aruba 

 Aruba Natural Bridge
 Quadiriki Caves

Bahamas 

 Lucayan cave system (Ben's Cave)

Barbados 

 Animal Flower Cave
 Harrison's Cave

Curaçao 

 Hato Caves

Cuba 

 Cuevas de Bellamar
 Cueva de Saturno
 La Gran Caverna de Santo Tomás
 Gran Caverna de Palmarito

Dominican Republic 

 Cuevas Fun Fun
 Pomier Caves
 Los Tres Ojos
 Cuevas de las Maravillas
 Furnia de Catanamatias

Haiti 

 Bellony Cave
 Kounoubwa Cave
 Marie-Jeanne Cave
 Voûte-à-Minguet

Jamaica 

 Bad Hole Cave
 Belmont Cave
 Carambie Cave
 Coffee River Cave
 Dunn's Hole
 Gourie Cave
 Green Grotto Caves
 Hutchinson's Hole
 Jackson's Bay Cave
 Long Mile Cave
 Morgans Pond Hole
 Mouth Maze Cave
 Oxford Cave
 Smokey Hole Cave
 Swansea Cave
 Thatchfield Great Cave
 Windsor Great Cave
 Xtabi

Puerto Rico 

 Cueva de Los Indios
 Cueva del Indio
 Cuevas Las Cabachuelas
 Cueva Lucero
 Cueva Ventana
 Parque Nacional de las Cavernas del Río Camuy
 Pozo de Jacinto

Saint Lucia 

 Bat Cave

Saint Vincent and the Grenadines 

 Byahaut Bat Cave

Trinidad and Tobago 

 Aripo Cave
 Crusoe Cave
 Cumaca Cave
 Dunston Cave
 La Vache
 Lopinot Cave
 Tamana caves

Turks and Caicos Islands 

 Conch Bar Caves

South America

Argentina 

 Cave 3, Los Toldos (Santa Cruz)
 Cueva de la Bruja
 Cueva de Gualicho
 Cueva de las Manos
 Cueva del Tigré
 Witches' Cave

Bolivia 

 Cavernas de Repechón
 Ch'usiq Uta
 Cueva del Diablo
 Qala Qala

Brazil 

 Abismo Guy Collet
 Abismo Ouro Grosso
 Areado Grande
 Buraco das Araras, Goiás
 Buraco das Araras, Mato Grosso do Sul
 Caverna Aroe Jari
 Caverna da Pedra Pintada
 Caverna da Tapagem
 Caverna de Santana
 Caverna dos Ecos
 Cavernas do Peruaçu National Park
 Conjunto Santa Rita
 Conjunto São Mateus
 Gruta Canabrava
 Gruta Casa de Pedra
 Gruta da Cabana
 Gruta da Morena
 Gruta da Torrinha
 Grutas das Areias
 Gruta de Maquiné
 Gruta de Ubajara
 Gruta do Centenário
 Gruta do Janelão
 Gruta do Lago Azul Natural Monument
 Gruta do Padre
 Gruta Olhos d'Água
 Gruta Rei do Mato
 Lapa da Mangabeira
 Lapa do Convento
 Lapa do Salitre
 Lapa dos Brejões
 Lapa Terra Ronca
 Parque da Cascata
 Poço Encantado
 Serra do Ramalho
 Toca da Barriguda
 Toca da Boa Vista

Chile 

 Cueva del Pirata
 Cueva de los Pincheira
 Catedral de Mármol
 Cueva del Milodón
 Cueva Fell
 Roiho cave system
 Perte du Futur
 Perte de la Détente
 Perte des Lobos
 Perte du Temps

Colombia 

 Guacharos Cave
 Cueva del Hipocampo 
 Hoyo de la Campesino 
 Cueva de la Tronera 
 Cueva de los Carracos 
 Hoyo de los Ocelotes 
 Hoyo de la Neblina 
Hoyo Sid El Perezoso

Ecuador 

 Cueva de los Tayos

Peru 

 Chivateros
 Guitarrero Cave
 Hatun Uchku
 Killa Mach'ay
 Pikimachay
 Pumawasi
 Qaqa Mach'ay
 Shihual
 Sima Pumacocha
 Tampu Mach'ay
 Toquepala Caves

South Georgia and the South Sandwich Islands 

 Cave Cove

Suriname 

 Werehpai

Uruguay 

 Palace Cave

Venezuela 

 Cueva Alfredo Jahn Natural Monument
 Cueva de la Quebrada del Toro
 Cueva del Fantasma
 Cueva del Guácharo
 Cueva del Saman
 Cueva La Segunda Cascada
 Cueva Los Encantos
 Cueva Los Laureles
 Cueva-Sumidero La Retirada
 Haitón del Guarataro
 Sima Aonda
 Sima Aonda 2
 Sima Aonda 3
 Sima Auyantepui Noroeste
 Sima Auyantepui Norte
 Sima Humboldt
 Sima Martel

Oceania

Australia 

 Abercrombie Caves
 Abrakurrie Cave
 Ashford Caves
 Borenore Caves
 Buchan Caves
 Bungonia Caves
 Camooweal Caves National Park
 Capricorn Caves
 Cave Gardens
 Cliefden Caves
 Cloggs Cave
 Devil's Lair
 Drovers Cave National Park
 Engelbrecht Cave
 Exit Cave
 Fireclay Caverns
 Fossil Cave
 Gunns Plains Cave
 Hastings Caves State Reserve
 Hermit's Cave
 Hippo's Yawn
 Jenolan Caves
 Koonalda Cave
 Koongine Cave
 Kutikina Cave
 London Bridge
 Mammoth Cave
 Mermaids Cave
 Moondyne Cave
 Mount Etna Caves National Park
 Murrawijinie Cave
 Naracoorte Caves
 New Guinea II cave
 Niggly Cave
 Ngilgi Cave
 Old Homestead Cave
 Pindar Cave
 Princess Margaret Rose Cave
 St Michaels Cave
 Tarragal Caves
 Tjunti
 Wellington Caves
 Willi Willi Caves
 Wombeyan Caves
 Wyanbene Caves
 Yarrangobilly Caves

Cook Islands 

 Anatakitaki Cave
 To'uri Cave
 Vaitaongo Cave

Federal States of Micronesia 

 Tonotan Guns and Caves

Guam 

 Mahlac Pictograph Cave
 Talagi Pictograph Cave
 Yokoi's Cave

Nauru 

 Moqua Caves

New Caledonia 

 Pindai Caves

New Zealand 

 Aurora Cave
 Broken River Cave
 Bulmer Cavern
 Cathedral Caves
 Clifden Limestone Caves
 Cracroft Caverns
 Ellis Basin cave system
 Gardner's Gut
 Harwood Hole
 Honeycomb Hill Cave
 Metro Cave / Te Ananui Cave
 Moncks Cave
 Nettlebed Cave
 Ngarua Caves
 Rawhiti Cave
 Riwaka Resurgence
 Ruakuri Cave
 Te Ana-au Caves
 Waitomo Caves
 Waitomo Glowworm Cave
 Wiri Lava Cave

Samoa 

 Falemauga Caves

Tuvalu 

 Caves of Nanumanga

Vanuatu 

 Yeyenwu

Mars 

 seven putative cave entrances have been identified in satellite imagery of the planet Mars, all so far located on the flanks of Arsia Mons. A more recent photograph of one of the features shows sunlight illuminating a side wall, suggesting that it may simply be a vertical pit rather than an entrance to a larger underground space.

See also 

List of deepest caves
List of longest caves
List of longest cave by country
Show cave
Speleology

References

External links 
 Member Caves Directory from the *National Caves Association
 World's Deepest Caves
 World Longest Caves
 World Cave Database
 World Cave Wiki Database made by cavers
 Famous Caves in the World

 Lists of caves